ER is an American medical drama television series created by novelist Michael Crichton that premiered on NBC from September 19, 1994. It was produced by Constant C Productions and Amblin Entertainment, in association with Warner Bros. Television, and was the longest running primetime medical drama until Grey's Anatomy surpassed it in 2019. ER follows the inner life of the emergency room (ER) of fictional County General Hospital in Chicago, Illinois, and various critical issues faced by the room's physicians and staff.

Series overview

Episodes

Season 1 (1994–95)

Season 2 (1995–96)

Season 3 (1996–97)

Season 4 (1997–98)

Season 5 (1998–99)

Season 6 (1999–2000)

Season 7 (2000–01)

Season 8 (2001–02)

Season 9 (2002–03)

Season 10 (2003–04)

Season 11 (2004–05)

Season 12 (2005–06)

Season 13 (2006–07)

Season 14 (2007–08)

Season 15 (2008–09)

Retrospective Special (2009)
This one-hour retrospective was aired before the last episode of season 15. It featured the production of the series.

Home video releases

References

External links

 ER's official episode guide "Seasons 1–11" from the Warner Bros. website
 ER's official episode guide "Seasons 12–15" from the NBC website
 

ER